Genetics Selection Evolution (known as GSE, and abbreviated with Genet. Sel. Evol.) is a bimonthly online-only peer-reviewed scientific journal covers original research on all aspects of genetics and selection in domestic animal species and other species providing results of immediate interest for farm animals' genetics. 

It was established in 1969 as the Annales de Génétique et de Sélection Animales. It was renamed to Génétique, Sélection, Évolution in 1983 and to its current name in 1989. Since January 2009, it has been published as an open access journal by BioMed Central. It is owned by the Institut national de la recherche agronomique (INRA), of which it is the official journal. The editors-in-chief are Didier Boichard (INRA), Jack Dekkers (Iowa State University), Helene Hayes (INRA), and Julius van der Werf (University of New England). According to the Journal Citation Reports, the journal has a 2019 impact factor of 3.950 (2 years IF) and 4.017 (5 years IF).

References

External links

Genetics journals
BioMed Central academic journals
Publications established in 1969
Bimonthly journals
Multilingual journals
Online-only journals